Linda Lanzillotta (born 7 September 1948) is an Italian politician. She was the minister for regional affairs and local communities between 2006 and 2008.

Early life
Lanzillotta was born in Cassano all'Ionio in the Province of Cosenza on 7 September 1948.

Career
Lanzillotta is a manager and academic. From 1970 to 1982 she worked at the ministry of budget and economic planning. She was a member of the Rome city council between 1997 and 1999. During this period she was the commissioner for economic, financial, and budgetary policy. She served as the secretary general to the Prime Minister's office for one year between 2000 and 2001. She was a faculty member at Rome 3 University from 2001 to 2005, where she taught courses on public management.

She was appointed minister for regional affairs and local communities in the cabinet led by Prime Minister Romano Prodi in May 2006. Her tenure lasted until 2008. She was a member of the Italian chamber of deputies for Alliance for Italy. She became a member of the Italian senate in February 2013 and was its vice-president until 2018.

She is a member of the Italy-USA Foundation. In addition, she is the founder and president of GLOCUS, an independent think tank, which she established in 2007 to promote reformist policies in Italy.

References

External links

21st-century Italian women politicians
1948 births
Alliance for Italy politicians
Civic Choice politicians
Democracy is Freedom – The Daisy politicians
Democratic Party (Italy) politicians
Deputies of Legislature XV of Italy
Deputies of Legislature XVI of Italy
Italian Socialist Party politicians
Italian women academics
Living people
People from Calabria
People from the Province of Cosenza
Politicians of Calabria
Senators of Legislature XVII of Italy
Women government ministers of Italy
Vice presidents of the Senate (Italy)
Women members of the Chamber of Deputies (Italy)
Women members of the Senate of the Republic (Italy)